The 1991 Giro d'Italia was the 74th edition of the Giro d'Italia, one of cycling's Grand Tours. The Giro began in Olbia, with a mountainous stage on 26 May, and Stage 10 occurred on 5 June with a stage to Langhirano. The race finished in Milan on 16 June.

Stage 1
26 May 1991 — Olbia to Olbia,

Stage 2a
27 May 1991 — Olbia to Sassari,

Stage 2b
27 May 1991 — Sassari,  (ITT)

Stage 3
28 May 1991 — Sassari to Cagliari,

Rest day
29 May 1991

Stage 4
30 May 1991 — Sorrento to Sorrento,

Stage 5
31 May 1991 — Sorrento to Scanno,

Stage 6
1 June 1991 — Scanno to Rieti,

Stage 7
2 June 1991 — Rieti to Città di Castello,

Stage 8
3 June 1991 — Città di Castello to Prato,

Stage 9
4 June 1991 — Prato to Felino,

Stage 10
5 June 1991 — Collecchio to Langhirano,  (ITT)

References

1991 Giro d'Italia
Giro d'Italia stages